Three Mills Lock, also known as the Prescott Lock is a lock on the Prescott Channel on the River Lea in London. The project was led by British Waterways and the lock officially opened on 5 June 2009.

The lock cuts off this section of the Bow Back Rivers from the tide, creating new opportunities for leisure boats, water taxis, trip boats and floating restaurants. It also helps freight traffic such as barges carrying construction materials to the sites of the 2012 Olympics and Stratford City.

Design
Three Mills Lock has been built on the Prescott Channel, which was constructed in the 1930s as part of a scheme for flood prevention and the creation of employment. It bypassed the tide mills at Three Mills, and included a sluice structure, which was used to control levels in the Bow Back Rivers much as the present structure is. This original structure became inoperative by the mid 1960s, and was removed in the 1980s, as the Bow Back Rivers had been classified as Remainder Waterways by the 1968 British Waterways Act, and there was no funding for maintenance. A consequence of this was that the rivers reverted to being tidal. This made navigation difficult, since there was not enough water at low tide, and at high tide, there was insufficient headroom, due to the low level of the Northern Outfall Sewer, which crosses the waterways.

With the selection of the island formed by the City Mills River and the Lee Navigation as the site for the 2012 London Olympics main stadium, restoration of the channels was thought to be an important part of the site development, particularly as it might allow some of the construction materials to be delivered by barge. A new lock and sluice structure was therefore designed for the Prescott Channel, with a second sluice on the Three Mills Wall River to prevent tidal water flowing backwards through the Three Mills tide mill. The sluice is designed to stabilise levels at  AOD, and the lock structure therefore has to cope with levels on the downstream side which might be higher or lower than those on the upstream side.

The tidal range is handled by the use of hydraulic sector gates at both ends of the lock, and the structure incorporates two large rising radial gates for flood control in the Bow Back Rivers.

A site in the river, just south of this lock is the resting place of the remains of the Euston Arch. A footbridge for pedestrians and a fish pass for migrating fish is incorporated into the design of the lock, and British Waterways claim there will be associated improvements to the navigation and tow path, as a part of the Olympic legacy.

Impact
The effect of building the lock, together with the Three Mills Wall River Weir is to lock out the tide just north of the House Mill. This means that this section of the Bow Back Rivers has ceased to be tidal. The lock has been constructed so that barges from two large building projects (the London 2012 Olympics and Stratford City) may pass through the lock, taking spoil out and delivering building materials on to the sites, via a new wharf on the Waterworks River. The barges will pass directly into the northern section of Bow Creek to the River Thames. The head of water created by the lock may be used to fill the mill pound and once more allow operation of the Three Mills tidal mill.

History
An unexploded  Hermann bomb from World War II was found on 2 June 2008. The bomb was made safe, in a controlled explosion, after five days of disruption to tube and rail services.

The lock opened officially on Friday 5 June 2009, and has begun limited operations, but the expected use of the lock is just "one barge a week".

Transport links
West Ham and Bromley-by-Bow are the nearest London Underground stations. The nearest Docklands Light Railway stations are Bow Church and Pudding Mill Lane

See also
Bow Back Rivers

Bibliography

References

Locks of the Lee Navigation
Locks of London
Buildings and structures in the London Borough of Newham
Geography of the London Borough of Newham
Mill Meads
Stratford, London